MAD TV Cyprus is a digital music channel and the Cypriot version of the Greek MAD TV, launched on July 1, 2011.

MAD TV Cyprus broadcasts mainly English, American, Cypriot and Greek music.

The launch party was named "Mad Party" and held in "RED" Club in Nicosia on 5 July 2011, with guest appearances from Kosta Martaki, Eleni Foureira, as well as Greek band as Onirama and the Cypriot singer Ivi Adamou.

MAD TV Cyprus is available through Velister digital platform, via cable on Cablenet and via IPTV on CytaVision.

At first, its programming will be similar to its sister channel in Greece but with Cypriot advertisements. Later the channel will have Cypriot programming.

See also
MAD TV Greece

External links
MAD TV Cyprus official site

Television channels in Cyprus
Television channels and stations established in 2011
Greek-language television stations
MAD TV (Greece)